Pua Almeida (1922–1974) was a Hawaiian steel guitarist, considered a leading performer on that instrument.

Almeida (sometimes given as "Alameida") was born in 1922 in Honolulu.  His musical start began in the band of his father, John Kameaaloha Almeida.  He formed his own big band, "The Sunset Serenaders" and performed at several top venues around Hawaii.  He relocated to Southern California in 1947, performing in clubs.  As the Hawaiian steel guitar achieved international status in the 1940s, Almeida was recognized as a master of the instrument.  In 1958 he began a 16-year association with the Surfrider Hotel.

He recorded for American Decca Records in 1966 and for MGM Records.  For seventeen years he was commonly featured on the Hawaii Calls radio program.

Pua suffered from poor heart health, and died in 1974.

References

1922 births
1974 deaths
Guitarists from Hawaii
People from Oahu
People of the Territory of Hawaii
Steel guitarists
20th-century American guitarists
American male guitarists
Decca Records artists
MGM Records artists
20th-century American male musicians
American people of Portuguese descent